is a Japanese footballer currently playing as a goalkeeper for Iwate Grulla Morioka.

Career statistics

Club
.

Notes

References

External links

1995 births
Living people
Japanese footballers
Association football goalkeepers
J3 League players
Montedio Yamagata players
Iwate Grulla Morioka players